Gertjie Williams (17 June 1941 – 4 October 2014) was a South African cricketer. He played seventeen first-class matches for Western Province between 1971 and 1975.

References

External links
 

1941 births
2014 deaths
South African cricketers
Western Province cricketers
Cricketers from Bellville, South Africa